Eskam (fl. 448-449 AD) was Hun living in 5th-century Pannonia, then under the Hunnic Empire. He was possibly a shaman. His daughter was one of the numerous wives of Attila the Hun.

Biography
He and his daughter are mentioned by Priscus in his account of his visit to the court of Attila. During their voyage with the Hun king towards his favorite town, the paths of Priscus' envoy and the Hunnic king's temporarily separated as the king was to pay a visit to Eskam and marry his daughter.

Otto Maenchen-Helfen derived his name from Turkic as, meaning "friend, companion", and qam, meaning "shaman."

Thus, it is possible that Eskam was a Hunnic shaman.

References

Year of birth unknown
Huns